A queen bee is an insect.

Queen bee may also refer to:

People 
 Lil' Kim (born 1974), known as Queen B/Bee
 Beyoncé (born 1981), known as Queen B/Bey

Music 
 Queen Bee (band), a Japanese musical group
 Queen Bee (EP), 2014 EP by Little Ghost
 Queen Bee Entertainment, a record label
 "Queen Bee", a song by John Lee Hooker
 "Queen Bee", a 1981 song by Grand Funk Railroad on the album Grand Funk Lives
 "Queen Bee", a 2014 single by Tina Guo
 Queen Bees, a Norwegian musical group made of up of Rita Eriksen, Anita Skorgan and Hilde Heltberg

TV and film 
 Queen Bee (film), a 1955 American film starring Joan Crawford
 The Queen Bee (女王蜂 Neoiwongfung), a 1974 Hong Kong film produced by Golden Harvest
 Queen Bees (TV series), a 2008 reality series that aired on The N

Literature 
 The Queen Bee, a fairy tale
"The Queen Bee (Garrett story)", a science fiction story by Randall Garrett
 Queen Bee (comics), the name of four different DC Comics supervillains
 Queen Bee (graphic novel), by Chynna Clugston
Queen Bee (newspaper), newspaper founded by Caroline Nichols Churchill in 1882
 , a 1951–1952 novel by Seishi Yokomizo in the Kōsuke Kindaichi series

Transportation 
 Queen Bee (aircraft), an unmanned aircraft used in World War II
 Queen Bee (ship), an 1852 barque that ran aground on Farewell Spit, New Zealand in 1877
 Queen Bee (steamer) a 1907 steam collier that sunk off Barrenjoey lighthouse Australia in 1922

Other uses 
 Queen bee (sociology), a term in cliques and social groups

See also 

 Queen bee syndrome, in which women discriminate against female subordinates
 Q-Bee, a character from the Darkstalkers video game series
 Queen B (disambiguation)